The Netherlands Football League Championship 1928–1929 was contested by 50 teams participating in five divisions. The national champion would be determined by a play-off featuring the winners of the eastern, northern, southern and two western football divisions of the Netherlands. PSV Eindhoven won this year's championship by beating Go Ahead, Feijenoord, Sparta Rotterdam and Velocitas 1897.

New entrants
Eerste Klasse East:
Promoted from 2nd Division: HVV Tubantia
Eerste Klasse North:
Promoted from 2nd Division: WVV Winschoten
Eerste Klasse West-I:
Moving in from West-II: ADO Den Haag, Koninklijke HFC, Sparta Rotterdam and Stormvogels
Promoted from 2nd Division: Hermes DVS
Eerste Klasse West-II:
Moving in from West-I: DFC, HFC EDO, SBV Excelsior and HBS Craeyenhout
Promoted from 2nd Division: VSV

Divisions

Eerste Klasse East

Eerste Klasse North

Eerste Klasse South

Eerste Klasse West-I

Eerste Klasse West-II

Championship play-off

References
RSSSF Netherlands Football League Championships 1898-1954
RSSSF Eerste Klasse Oost
RSSSF Eerste Klasse Noord
RSSSF Eerste Klasse Zuid
RSSSF Eerste Klasse West

Netherlands Football League Championship seasons
1928–29 in Dutch football
Neth